Southern Moreton Bay Islands is a national park in Queensland, Australia, 44 km southeast of Brisbane.  It forms part of the Moreton Bay and Pumicestone Passage Important Bird Area, so identified by BirdLife International because it supports large numbers of migratory waders, or shorebirds.

See also

 Protected areas of Queensland

References

National parks of South East Queensland
Important Bird Areas of Queensland
Islands of Moreton Bay